Artem Galyak (born 29 August 1995) is a Belarusian professional footballer. As of 2021, he plays for and coaches Vertikal Kalinkovichi (as a player-manager).

References

External links 
 
 

1995 births
Living people
Belarusian footballers
Association football forwards
FC Slavia Mozyr players
FC Vertikal Kalinkovichi players
FC Lokomotiv Gomel players
FC Naftan Novopolotsk players
FC Granit Mikashevichi players
FC Khimik Svetlogorsk players
Belarusian football managers